

Hydroelectric

Thermal

Photovoltaic

See also 

 Energy in Greece
 Renewable energy in Greece
 Wind power in Greece
 Solar power in the European Union
 Solar power in Greece
 List of photovoltaics companies
 Photovoltaic array
 Photovoltaics

References 

Greece
 
Power stations